Marita schoutenensis is a species of sea snail, a marine gastropod mollusk in the family Mangeliidae.

Description
The length of the shell attains 5.3 mm, its diameter 2.5 mm.

The solid, yellowish white shell has a subfusiform shape. It contains 5 rounded whorls, including a large protoconch of two rounded polished whorls. The other whorls are strongly ribbed by distant curved ribs, about 12 on the spire.  On the body whorl they disappear above the middle. The whole shell is girt by numerous irregularly spaced impressed lines, which pass over the ribs. The aperture is elongate, oval, with no contraction for a siphonal canal. The outer lip is thin, curved, with a moderate sinus at the suture, which bends the ribs. The columella  is straight.

Distribution
This marine species is endemic to Australia and occurs off New South Wales, Tasmania and Victoria.

References

 Tate, R. & May, W.L. 1901. A revised census of the marine Mollusca of Tasmania. Proceedings of the Linnean Society of New South Wales 26(3): 344-471

External links
  Tucker, J.K. 2004 Catalog of recent and fossil turrids (Mollusca: Gastropoda). Zootaxa 682:1-1295.
 Marita schoutenensis

schoutenensis
Gastropods described in 1901
Gastropods of Australia